Christian E. Christiansen (born 14 December 1972) is a Danish filmmaker.

His most recent film, "On the Edge", was originally released as Lev stærkt ("Live Strong"), and was summarized in IMDB as "Two hard-living best friends and aficionados of illegal racing contests find their bond tested when one of them goes to trial for vehicular homicide."

Filmography

References

External links
 
 
 On The Edge at IMDb
 Om natten at Oscar.com

1972 births
Danish film directors
Danish film producers
Danish male screenwriters
Living people
People from Kalundborg